Grebănu is a commune in Buzău County, Muntenia, Romania. It is composed of six villages: Grebănu, Homești, Livada, Livada Mică, Plevna and Zăplazi.

Natives
 Pimen Zainea (1929 - 2020), Orthodox Archbishop of Suceava and Rădăuți (1991 - 2020)

Notes

Communes in Buzău County
Localities in Muntenia